Robert Jacks  (8 March 1943, Melbourne—14 August 2014, Castlemaine) was an Australian painter, sculptor and printmaker.

Born in Melbourne, Australia. He studied sculpture from 1958 to 1960 at the Prahran Technical College, Melbourne, and painting in 1961 and 1962 at the Royal Melbourne Institute of Technology (now RMIT University).

In 1966 he had his first solo exhibition at Gallery A, Melbourne from which a work was purchased for the collection of the National Gallery of Victoria. In 1968, he participated in The Field an extremely influential exhibition, held at the new National Gallery of Victoria building in St Kilda Road, which effectively launched color field abstraction in Australia.

He taught at Rochedale College, Toronto before moving to New York City in 1969. He returned to Melbourne in 1978 to be artist-in-residence at the University of Melbourne.

The winner of many art awards and prizes, he has exhibited consistently in Australia since 1966 in more than 50 solo exhibitions, including retrospectives.

In 2001 the Bendigo Art Gallery established the Robert Jacks Drawing Prize. In 2006, he was named an Officer of the Order of Australia (AO).

His mature work, while emerging out of the international abstract 'color field' movement of the late '60s, retains an ambiguous link to the representation of appearances, especially of objects in space.
"I think my work has always been minimal and abstract because when I was being taught sculpture, it was expressed in abstract terms. Form in space, mass and volume - that sort of thing. Painting, for me, is an extension of sculptural ideas."In the latter part of his life Jack lived in Harcourt, and died from complications of asthma at Castlemaine Hospital.

Collections
 Castlemaine Art Museum
 Bendigo Art Gallery
 National Gallery of Victoria

Further reading 
 Patrick McCaughey (2001) 'Gallery notes', Australian Book Review, September.
 Grant, Rozentals and Anderson (2014)'Robert Jacks - Order and Variation' NGV Exhibition
 Ken McGregor & Robert Jacks (2001) Robert Jacks: Past Unfolded, Fine Art Publishing
 David Thomas (2003) 'Underwater garden', Metro 5 Gallery, exhibition catalogue

References

External links 
 Compelling vesture No 1 1965 - Ballarat Fine Art Gallery
 
 Australian Book Review

1943 births
2014 deaths
Australian Anglicans
Australian painters
Australian printmakers
21st-century Australian sculptors
Officers of the Order of Australia
Artists from Melbourne
RMIT University alumni